Gillian Bourke (born 28 August 1984) is a female rugby union player. She represented  at the 2010 and 2014 Women's Rugby World Cup, where she was voted the Number 2 position in the WRWC Team of the Tournament. 

She has 51 caps for Ireland, playing from 2008-2015, winning the Six Nations Grand Slam in 2013, and the Six Nations Championship in 2015.

She was also invited to play with the legendary Barbarians team in February 2018 against the British Army, and again in April 2019 against the USA Women’s National team in Denver, Colorado. She was voted  Munster Women’s Player of the Year for the 2017-18 season. 

In August 2019, she moved from her club Stade Francais in Paris to join Tyrrell’s Premier 15s giants Harlequins.

Bourke studied Sport Science at the University of Limerick. She is a performance analyst.

She works as a Game Analyst with World Rugby.

References

External links
Irish Rugby Player Profile 

1984 births
Living people
Irish female rugby union players
Ireland women's international rugby union players
UL Bohemians R.F.C. players
Munster Rugby women's players
Alumni of the University of Limerick